= Children First Offenders Second =

Youth justice model

Children First, Offenders Second (CFOS) is a progressive and positive youth justice model that consists of eight principles. The model is structured to make a child the focus of any responses that are made, in view of their offending behavior.

== Principles ==
1. Child-friendly and child-appropriate treatment
2. Diversionary action - not punishment, justice, or welfare-based
3. Prevention as inclusive
4. Evidence-based partnership
5. Kindness - not labels or stigma
6. Systems management - not unprincipled net-widening
7. Partnership with the state
8. Placing responsibility with the adult and not the child

"Children First, Offenders Second", also known as "positive youth justice", challenges what its authors view as outdated, punitive, stigmatizing and unethical models of youth justice. It focuses on the use of risk factor paradigms in risk-based youth justice.

== Sources ==
- Haines, Kevin; Case, Stephen (2015). Positive youth justice: Children first, offenders second. Policy Press. ISBN 978-1-4473-2173-6. Archived from the original on 2015-06-18. Children First Offenders Second at Google Books
- Haines, K.R.; Drakeford, M. (1998). Young People and Youth Justice. Macmillan Distribution Lt. ISBN 978-0-333-68759-8.
- Case, S.P.; Haines, K.R. (15 May 2006). "Risk Management and Early Intervention.". In Goldson, Barry; Muncie, John (eds.). Youth Crime and Justice. SAGE Publications. ISBN 978-1-4462-2892-0.
- Haines, K.R. (25 February 2014). "The disaggregation of youth justice". In Taylor, Wayne; Earle, Rod; Hester, Richard (eds.). Youth Justice Handbook: Theory, Policy and Practice. Routledge. ISBN 978-1-317-82175-5.
- Case, Stephen; Haines, Kevin (2009). Understanding Youth Offending: Risk Factor Research, Policy and Practice. Routledge. ISBN 978-1-84392-342-8.
